São Vicente do Paul e Vale de Figueira is a civil parish in the municipality of Santarém, Portugal. It was formed in 2013 by the merger of the former parishes São Vicente do Paul and Vale de Figueira. The population in 2011 was 2,917, in an area of 71.82 km².

References

Freguesias of Santarém, Portugal